Transatlantic, Trans-Atlantic or TransAtlantic may refer to:

Film
 Transatlantic Pictures, a film production company from 1948 to 1950
 Transatlantic Enterprises, an American production company in the late 1970s
 Transatlantic (1931 film), an American comedy starring Edmund Lowe
 Transatlantic (1960 film), a British film
 Transatlantic (1998 film), a Croatian film by Mladen Juran

Literature
 Trans-Atlantyk a 1953 novel by Witold Gombrowicz
 TransAtlantic (novel), a 2013 book by Colum McCann

Music
 Transatlantic Records, an independent record label active in the UK in the 1960s and 1970s
 Transatlantic (band), a multinational progressive rock supergroup
 The Transatlantics, an Australian funk and soul band
 Transatlantic (opera), a 1928 opera by George Antheil
 Transatlantic (Chris Potter album), 2011

Transport  

 Transatlantic crossing, by sea
 Transatlantic flight
 Transatlantic slave trade
 TransAtlantic Lines, an American shipping company
 MV TransAtlantic, a container ship owned and operated by TransAtlantic Lines
 Mersey (1894 ship) or Transatlantic

See also 
 Atlantic Bridge (disambiguation)
 Bridge over the Atlantic
 Ocean current
 Transatlantic accent
 Transatlantic communications cable
 Transatlantic Economic Council
 Transatlantic relations
 Transatlantico, part of the Palazzo Montecitorio in Rome